Mame Mamadou Mbengue N'Diaye (born 30 December 1986) is a Senegalese former professional footballer who played as a left-back. He spent the entirety of his playing career in France, representing Marseille, Libourne, Boulogne, AC Amiens, Beauvais, and Roye-Noyon.

References
 Mame N'Diaye at foot-national.com
 
 
 
 

1986 births
Living people
Sportspeople from Thiès
Association football defenders
Senegalese footballers
Olympique de Marseille players
FC Libourne players
US Boulogne players
Aviron Bayonnais FC players
AC Amiens players
AS Beauvais Oise players
Ligue 1 players
Ligue 2 players
Championnat National 2 players
Championnat National 3 players
Senegalese expatriate footballers
Senegalese expatriate sportspeople in France
Expatriate footballers in France